MTV Africa (formerly MTV South Africa) is an African pay television from Paramount Networks EMEAA. It focuses mainly on rebroadcasting MTV US content as well as airing local-produced reality series. Founded by Alex Okosi and launched as 'Africas MTV' alongside founding members Jandre Louw, Dudu Qubu and Maya Padmore.

History 

 1995 – Pan-African satellite provider DStv launched 17 international channels on its service, including MTV Europe and VH1 Europe. These channels were the major promoters of international genres of music to the continent.
 2004 – MTV Networks International announced it had plans to launch its 100th channel in Africa with the launch of MTV Africa (proposed branding). In February 2005, MTV Networks International launched MTV Base Africa. The channel was launched with a live music special with performances from local African and international artists. MTV Base Africa also promoted MTV Europe and aired some of its reality-based programmes.
 2012 – MTV Base and its other sister channels increased its promotion of MTV (which had already started airing less of music and more of reality shows) by airing its promos and also opened a Facebook and Twitter page named MTVONDSTV.
 2013 – In June, MTV Base divided itself into two feeds, one exclusively for South Africa and the other airing for the rest of the continent. While MTV was going to get a localised feed exclusively for South Africa, the rest of the continent would have been served by the European feed. However, MTV South Africa was also launched across East and West Africa and replaced MTV Europe. Despite its coverage area, the channel was only focused towards its Southern African viewers. It aired shows from MTV US, music programming and two local shows, MTV choice, which was a magazine show, and Jou Ma Se MTV, which was a playlist of South African music videos. The channel also launched a website, mtv.co.za to follow it and its social pages was changed from MTVONDSTV to MTVZA.
 2015 – MTV reduced its music airing time to 02:00 CAT to 06:00 CAT instead of 02:00 CAT to 09:00 CAT and music was no longer aired at noon. MTV South Africa rebranded to MTV Africa and its name on its social pages was changed to MTVAFRICA. The website which still has the South African domain ".za" is still used. Another local show named MTV #YouGotGot, which featured a team of South African pranksters tricking people and celebrities, was premiered.
2019 - VH1 Classic rebranded into MTV Music 24 in SD with MTV, Comedy Central, BET, Nickelodeon (South Africa) and MTV Base are now available in HD.

Availability 
MTV Africa is available in Sub-Saharan Africa exclusively through DStv. It is available in Southern Africa through the Compact, Extra and Premium bouquets while in the rest of Africa on Compact, Compact + and Premium and can be accessed in two million households in the region. The channel was originally available exclusively on DStv Premium following MTV Europe.

Logos

Shows 
Sleeping in the Family
Awkward
Faking It
MTV News
The Real World
Geordie Shore
Teen Mom
Teen Mom 2
16 & Pregnant

Lip Sync Battle
Lip Sync Battle Africa
This Model Life
Fired by Mom and Dad
The Hills
Ex on the Beach
Guy Code
Girl Code
MTV#YouGotGot
Catfish: The TV Show
Ridiculousness
Ridiculousness Africa
Pimp My Ride
Are You The One?
The Challenge
Jersey Shore
MTV's Bugging out
#Have Faith  
Nick Cannon Presents Wild 'n Out 
Deliciousness 
Ghosted: Love Gone Missing 
Love & Hip Hop: Miami 
Award Shows and Live Music Specials
BET Awards
BET Hip Hop Awards
MTV Africa Music Awards
MTV Europe Music Awards
MTV Video Music Awards
MTV Movie Awards
MTV World Stage
Nickelodeon Kids' Choice Awards
Isle of MTV

See also
MTV Base Africa
MTV Portugal
MTV France
MTV Rocks
Club MTV
MTV Hits

References

External links 
MTV Africa

MTV channels
Television channels and stations established in 2013
Television channel articles with incorrect naming style
Television stations in South Africa